Appie Groen (7 September 1901 – 29 February 1964) was a Dutch footballer. He played in five matches for the Netherlands national football team from 1922 to 1926.

References

External links
 

1901 births
1964 deaths
Dutch footballers
Netherlands international footballers
Place of birth missing
Association footballers not categorized by position